Ptyongnathosia spinosa is a species of moth of the family Tortricidae. It is found in Loja Province, Ecuador.

The wingspan is about 16.5 mm. The ground colour of the forewings is greyish cream, slightly tinged brownish and with blackish dots. The hindwings are whitish, spotted with grey.

Etymology
The species name refers to the structure of the gnathos and is derived from Latin spinosus (meaning spiny).

References

Moths described in 2008
Euliini